Nemtsev (literally "Germans") is a Russian masculine surname, its feminine counterpart is Nemtseva. It may refer to
Alexey Nemtsev (born 1982), Kazakhstani ski-orienteering competitor 
Ivan Nemtsev (1923–1997), Russian lieutenant of the Soviet army

See also
Nemtsov

Russian-language surnames